Asura  is a Chinese epic fantasy film based on Buddhist mythology. It is the directorial debut of stunt coordinator Peng Zhang. The film is the first in a planned trilogy and was released on 13 July 2018.

Synopsis
The story is set in Asura, the dimension of pure desire according to ancient Buddhist mythology. The mythical realm is threatened by a coup from a lower heavenly kingdom and the story follows from there.

Cast
 Leo Wu as Ruyi
 Carina Lau as Asura King, Head of Cunning
 Tony Leung Ka-fai as Asura King, Head of Desire
 Ming Dao as Doctor
 Zhang Yishang as Hua
Matt William Knowles as Rawa
 Damien Walters
 Umar Khan as Jeeon
 Caitlin Dechelle
 Paul Philip Clark
 Gigi Feshold
 Augustus Du Guy
 Alexander J. Guy
 Ron Smoorenburg
 Jeannine Derbez
 Joseph Castillo
 Shakirudeen Alade as Dolo
 Bonetics Junior

Production
The film is directed by renowned Hollywood stunt coordinator Peng Zhang (The Twilight Saga, Ant-Man) and produced by Alibaba Pictures. The film's screenplay is written by Zhenjian Yang (Painted Skin: The Resurrection). Oscar winner Ngila Dickson (The Lord of the Rings franchise) serves as the costume designer, while Martín Hernandez (The Revenant, Birdman) serves as the audio director. Charlie Iturriaga (Deadpool, Furious 7, The Social Network) is in charge of the visual effects.

Filming 
Asura is shot in seven locations across China, including Ningxia Hui Autonomous Region, the Qinghai-Tibet Plateau and the city of Liupanshui in Guizhou Province.

Reception

Box office
Asura earned a disappointing 49 million yuan ($7.3 million U.S.) in its opening weekend and was pulled from cinemas after a statement on social media; the statement gave no explanation for the move. However, a representative from Zhenjian Film, which is credited as lead producer, later told Chinese news site Sina: "This decision was made not only because of the bad box office. We plan to make some changes to the film and release it again." Despite these statements, the film has never been exhibited or marketed anywhere again.

References

External links
 

2018 films
Chinese fantasy adventure films
2010s fantasy adventure films
Alibaba Pictures films
2010s Mandarin-language films